Marc Demeyer (19 April 1950 – 20 January 1982)  was a professional road racing cyclist from Avelgem, Belgium. He died of a heart attack at the age of 31.

Demeyer turned professional in 1972 for the Flandria team managed by Briek Schotte. He signed the contract while resting it on a car beside the start of Dwars door België, which he then won. Shortly afterwards he won the Grand Prix d'Isbergues.

Demeyer was one of the so-called "Three Musketeers", riding with and for Freddy Maertens and Michel Pollentier He led out sprints for Maertens in particular but could win them for himself, including stages of the Tour de France. He rode the Tour six times, finishing 72nd in 1973, 41st in 1974, 42nd in 1975, 56th in 1976, 49th in 1978 and 57th in 1979.

He won the intermediate sprints competition, known then as Points Chaud ('hot spot sprints') in the Tours of 1973 and 1975. He won two stages: the 19th in 1978 from Lausanne to Belfort, and the 14th in 1979 from Belfort to Evian-les-Bains. In 1974 he won Paris–Brussels and two years later Paris–Roubaix.

Major results

1971 
 1st Ronde Van Vlaanderen Beloften
 Peace Race
1st Stages 5 & 9 
1972
 1st Dwars door België
 1st Grand Prix d'Isbergues
 1st Grand Prix Fayt-le-Franc
 7th Overall Tour d'Indre-et-Loire
1973
 1st Grand Prix de Denain
 1st Stage 1 Four Days of Dunkirk
 1st Intermediate sprints classification Tour de France
 3rd Scheldeprijs
 9th Kuurne–Brussels–Kuurne
1974
 1st Scheldeprijs
 1st Grand Prix Pino Cerami
 1st Paris–Brussels
 3rd Paris–Roubaix
 5th Overall Tour de Luxembourg
 5th Tour of Flanders
 6th Dwars door België
 6th Grand Prix Fayt-le-Franc
 6th Rund um den Henninger Turm Frankfurt
 7th Overall Four Days of Dunkirk
1st Stage 2
 8th Overall Tour of Belgium
 8th Coppa Ugo Agostoni
 9th E3 Prijs Vlaanderen
 9th Grote Prijs Jef Scherens
1975
 1st Nokere Koerse
 1st Stage 3a Four Days of Dunkirk
 1st Intermediate sprints classification in the Tour de France
 3rd Tour of Flanders
 4th Paris–Roubaix
 5th Gent–Wevelgem
 5th Kuurne–Brussels–Kuurne
 5th Rund um den Henninger Turm Frankfurt
 6th Scheldeprijs
 7th Road race, National Road Championships
 9th E3 Prijs Vlaanderen
 9th Omloop Het Volk
 10th Overall Tour de Luxembourg
1st Stage 2 
1976
 1st Paris–Roubaix
 2nd Dwars door België
 3rd Tour of Flanders
 6th Overall Four Days of Dunkirk
 7th Scheldeprijs
1977
 1st Scheldeprijs
 1st Omloop van het Houtland
 1st Circuit des Frontières
 Giro d'Italia
1st Stages 14 & 16a
 2nd Paris–Brussels
 2nd Grand Prix de Wallonie
 3rd Dwars door België
 5th Kampioenschap van Vlaanderen
 7th Tour of Flanders
 7th Grote Prijs Jef Scherens
1978
 1st Stage 19 Tour de France
 3rd Grand Prix Fayt-le-Franc
 4th Grote Prijs Stad Zottegem
 6th E3 Prijs Vlaanderen
 6th De Kustpijl
 9th Omloop Het Volk
 10th Paris–Roubaix
1979
 1st De Kustpijl
 1st Stage 14 Tour de France
 1st Stage 4 Critérium du Dauphiné Libéré
 1st Stage 2 Tour of Belgium
 1st Stage 1 Setmana Catalana de Ciclisme
 Grand Prix du Midi Libre
1st Stages 3 & 4
 Four Days of Dunkirk 
1st Stages 1, 2 & 5a 
 2nd Tour of Flanders
 3rd Züri-Metzgete
 4th Gent–Wevelgem
 4th La Flèche Wallonne
 8th Paris–Roubaix
 9th Road race, National Road Championships
 9th Omloop Het Volk
1980
 1st Circuit des Frontières
 1st Stage 3 Grand Prix du Midi Libre
 2nd Paris–Brussels
 5th Paris–Roubaix
 5th Tour of Flanders
 6th Grote Prijs Jef Scherens
 8th Overall Four Days of Dunkirk
 9th Omloop Het Volk
1981
 5th Paris–Roubaix
 5th Gent–Wevelgem
 10th E3 Prijs Vlaanderen

See also
 List of doping cases in cycling

External links
Profile by cyclinghalloffame.com
Profile by velo-club.net 
Profile by memoire-du-cyclisme.net 

Belgian male cyclists
Belgian Tour de France stage winners
Doping cases in cycling
1950 births
1982 deaths
Cyclists from West Flanders
People from Avelgem